North Hills is the debut studio album by American folk-rock band Dawes, released on August 18, 2009.

Reviews

North Hills received mostly favorable reviews from the music critics. AbsolutePunk's Gregory Robson said the album "is the sound of something truly astonishing beginning to take shape" with "near-flawless roots-rock offerings that drip with such a defined sense of soul, grit and harmony, it feels nearly criminal to label this album contemporary." Pemberton Roach called them a "rootsy quartet" with a "tasteful vibe", and an "earthy sound." At Filter, Kyle MacKinnel described the album as "straightforward" and a "refreshing reminder of our roots" that "notches a victory for the believers." The Line of Best Fit's Melanie McGovern predicted the release would "be as easily digested and perhaps more soul baring as one would hope."

Stereo Subversion's Dan MacIntosh wrote that "where ever this North Hills hideaway is, it sure sounds like the place to be for those in search of a quality music retreat." At This Is Fake DIY, Martyn Young said the album was "full of subtle wonder, and in its evocative charms you can easily see how Dawes have become so feted". However, Doug Freeman of The Austin Chronicle derided the album saying that "working a sound this classic doesn't allow for many surprises". A  PopMatters review said the album's sound was "too obvious in its attempt to fit into a certain mold", and called the effort "a last-ditch effort to hop on a bandwagon".

Track listing

Personnel
Dawes
Taylor Goldsmith – lead vocals, guitars
Griffin Goldsmith – drums, vocals, percussion
Wylie Gelber – bass guitar
Tay Strathairn – piano, vocals, organ
Patrick Sansone - guitars, vocals, organ, percussion

Charts
The album peaked at #23 on the Billboard Heatseeker chart.

References

External links 
Dawes Official Website

2009 debut albums
Dawes (band) albums